Michael Smith (born January 17, 1971) is a Canadian retired ice hockey defenseman who was an All-American for Lake Superior State.

Career
Smith was recruited to Lake Superior State in 1989 and played his freshman season under Frank Anzalone. Smith was an unheralded but effective player his first season, helping the Lakers tie the program record with 33 wins. The following season, with Anzalone leaving to coach in the professional ranks, Smith saw his ice time and production blossom under former assistant Jeff Jackson. Smith more than doubled his career totals and got LSSU to set a new program record with 36 wins to go with the Lakers' first conference championship. Lake State received the top western seed, however, Clarkson arrived ready to play in the 1991 national quarterfinals and took two of three games to knock out the tournament favorites. Despite the bad end, Smith was selected by the Buffalo Sabres in the 12th round of the NHL Draft.

For his junior season, Smith's numbers declined slightly but that didn't stop the Lakers from having another dominant campaign. LSSU finished second in the CCHA but used their stellar defense to capture a second conference title and head back to the NCAA tournament. This time the team was a 3-seed and missed out on a bye, but the Lakers persevered and ran roughshod over their opponents in the first two rounds. They slowed down a bit in the national semifinal, but were still able to drop Michigan State 4–2. The championship game against Wisconsin turned into a bit of a debacle due to questionable penalty calls but the Lakers were the ones who were ahead when the dust settled. Smith scored lake Superior's third goal of the game to give his team its first lead and helped shut down the Badger's offense in the later half of the game to give LSSU its second National Championship.

Smith was named an alternate captain for his senior season and the Lakers were again one of the best teams in the country. Lake State won its third consecutive conference title while Smith was named an All-American. LSSU received the top western seed once more but this time the team used it to their advantage. Lake State marched all the way to the championship game and were faced with one of the most dominant teams in NCAA history, 1993 Maine. The Black Bears got off to a quick start with two goals before the first period was half over but Lake Superior's defense tightened up afterwards and allowed their offense to begin whittling down Maine's advantage. The Lakers scored 4 consecutive goals in just over 20 minutes to take a 2-goal lead into the third. Unfortunately for Smith, his team was facing down the nation's top offense, led by future Hall of Famer Paul Kariya, and Maine was able to get three goals in quick succession to snatch victory away from Lake Superior. With his college career now over, Smith finished out the year with a pair of games for the Rochester Americans.

Buffalo decided not to sign Smith to a rookie contract so he ended up joining his former coach, Frank Anzalone, with the Roanoke Express. Smith played the bulk of the next 5 seasons for Roanoke, leaving several times to play AAA hockey with several teams but he could never stick at the top level of the minor leagues. When Anzalone became the first head coach for the Lowell Lock Monsters in 1998, Smith decided to call it a career and retired as a player.

Statistics

Regular season and playoffs

Awards and honors

References

External links

1971 births
Living people
AHCA Division I men's ice hockey All-Americans
Buffalo Sabres draft picks
Canadian ice hockey defencemen
Lake Superior State Lakers men's ice hockey players
Minnesota Moose players
NCAA men's ice hockey national champions
Rochester Americans players
Roanoke Express players
Saginaw Lumber Kings players
Saint John Flames players
Ice hockey people from Winnipeg
Tulsa Oilers (1992–present) players